Lisa Niemi Swayze  (born May 26, 1956) is an American writer, dancer, choreographer, actress, and director. She is the widow of actor and dancer Patrick Swayze.

Early life 
Lisa Anne Haapaniemi was born in Houston, Texas, the only daughter of six children born to Edmond, a Red Cross worker, and Karin Haapaniemi, a registered nurse. Niemi has said her father and her mother's professions were her inspiration and encouragement. She is of Finnish ancestry. She graduated from the Houston Ballet Dance Company in 1974. She shortened her surname from Haapaniemi to Niemi in 1977 for her theatre stage name. The Finnish family name translates to "Aspen peninsula".

Career
In the 1970s, Niemi and her husband pursued dance careers in New York City.

Films
Lisa Niemi Swayze wrote, directed and starred in the 2003 film One Last Dance alongside her husband. One Last Dance was based on Without a Word, a successful play written 18 years before which had won six Drama Critics Awards. Niemi said, "It was basically based on our experiences as concert dancers in New York, and it affected people a lot."

She co-starred in Steel Dawn (1987) with Swayze and co-starred in Beat Angel (2004). Niemi also appeared in Letters from a Killer, Next of Kin, Younger and Younger, Live! From Death Row, She's Having a Baby and Slam Dance. Niemi directed Dance, a 1990 film.

Television
Niemi co-starred as Carla Frost in 23 episodes of the TV series Super Force from 1990 to 1991. She once again directed her husband, this time in an episode of his TV series The Beast. The episode, titled "No Turning Back", aired on April 9, 2009. It was his last performance before his death.

Books
On September 29, 2009, Niemi Swayze released a memoir, The Time of My Life, which became a New York Times Best Seller. The book was co-written by Patrick Swayze, and it was finished shortly before his death. On January 2, 2012, Niemi Swayze released another memoir, Worth Fighting For, which also became a New York Times Best Seller.

Personal life

At age 14, at the Houston Ballet Dance Company, Niemi met the owner and director's son, Patrick Swayze; the two eventually got married when she was 19 years old. Niemi and Swayze were married on June 12, 1975, and remained married until Swayze's death from pancreatic cancer on September 14, 2009. Shortly after they wed, the couple moved to New York City to pursue their dance careers until the late 1970s, when they relocated to Los Angeles, California. In addition to dancing and filmmaking, they ran a construction business and raised horses together. The Swayzes had no children.

In 1985, Lisa Swayze began living on a  homestead near the Angeles National Forest, along with a "menagerie of dogs, prized Arabian horses and rodeo cattle". She also had a  ranch in New Mexico.

She is a licensed pilot and flew Swayze to his cancer treatments prior to his death. While filming One Last Dance in Winnipeg, Manitoba, Niemi was made an honorary citizen of the city. After her husband's death, she became the Chief Ambassador of Hope for Pancreatic Cancer Action Network. In July 2011, she was made a Dame of the Royal Order of Francis I of the Two Sicilies.

On December 28, 2013, it was announced that she was engaged to Albert DePrisco, a jeweler. On May 25, 2014, the couple were married.

Bibliography 
 Swayze, Patrick; Niemi Swayze, Lisa: The Time of My Life. Atria Books, 2010. 
 Niemi Swayze, Lisa: Worth Fighting For: Love, Loss, and Moving Forward. Atria Books, 2012.

References

External links
 
 

1956 births
Living people
Actresses from Houston
American choreographers
American female dancers
American dancers
American film actresses
Screenwriters from Texas
American television actresses
American people of Finnish descent
American women film directors
American women screenwriters
Film directors from Texas
21st-century American women